Félix Patzi Paco (born 21 February 1967) is a Bolivian academic and politician. He was the governor of the La Paz Department from 2015 to 2021. A member of the Aymara ethnic group, he has been active in supporting indigenous movements in Bolivia.

Political career
Born in Santiago de Llallagua, Aroma, La Paz, Patzi served as Bolivia's Minister of Education in the government of Evo Morales from 2006 to 2007. In 2010, he was briefly a candidate for governor of La Paz Department on behalf of the Movement for Socialism – Political Instrument for the Sovereignty of the Peoples (MAS-IPSP), but was removed following a drunk driving incident. In March 2010, he founded a new political party, Integration for Change (IPC), which was later organized as the Third System Movement.

In the 2015, he ran again for governor of La Paz, this time on behalf of the Sovereignty and Freedom party (SOL.bo) founded by La Paz's mayor, Luis Revilla. He won the March 29 elections with 52% of the vote, far ahead of rival candidate Felipa Huanca of the MAS-IPSP, becoming SOL.bo's highest elected official.

Religion 
Felix Patzi is a worshiper of the religion of Pachamama, the Earth goddess.

References 

|-

1967 births
Living people
21st-century Bolivian politicians
Governors of La Paz